Yusuf Abdurisag (born 6 August 1999) is a professional footballer who plays as a winger for Qatar Stars League side Al-Wakrah SC and the Qatar national football team.

Club career
Abdurisag began his professional career with Al Sadd SC in 2018. In January 2019 he was loaned to Al-Arabi SC and returned in August 2020. In January 2023 he joined Al-Wakrah SC.

Career statistics

International

International goals
Scores and results list Qatar's goal tally first.

Honours

Club
Al-Sadd
Qatar Stars League: 2020–21, 2021–22
Qatar Cup: 2021
Emir of Qatar Cup: 2020, 2021
Qatari Stars Cup: 2019-20

References

External links

1999 births
Living people
Qatari footballers
Qatar youth international footballers
Qatar international footballers
Al Sadd SC players
Al-Arabi SC (Qatar) players
Qatar Stars League players
Association football wingers
Qatari people of Somali descent
Naturalised citizens of Qatar
Qatar under-20 international footballers
2021 CONCACAF Gold Cup players